The Siphonopidae are the family of common caecilians.  They are found in Central and South America.  Like other caecilians, they superficially resemble worms or snakes.

They are the sister group to Dermophiidae, also of South America. Siphonopids are oviparous caecilians, meaning they lay eggs. They have imperforated stapes and no inner mandibular teeth. Like species of some other caecilian families, their skulls have relatively few bones, with those present being fused to form a solid ram to aid in burrowing through the soil. The mouth is recessed beneath the snout, and there is no tail.

Genera and species 

Genus Brasilotyphlus
Brasilotyphlus braziliensis
Brasilotyphlus dubium
Brasilotyphlus guarantanus
Genus Luetkenotyphlus
Luetkenotyphlus brasiliensis
Luetkenotyphlus fredi
Luetkenotyphlus insulanus
Genus Microcaecilia
Microcaecilia albiceps
Microcaecilia butantan
Microcaecilia dermatophaga 
Microcaecilia grandis
Microcaecilia iwokramae
Microcaecilia iyob
Microcaecilia marvaleewakeae
Microcaecilia nicefori
Microcaecilia pricei
Microcaecilia rabei
Microcaecilia rochai
Microcaecilia savagei
Microcaecilia supernumeraria
Microcaecilia taylori
Microcaecilia trombetas
Microcaecilia unicolor
Genus Mimosiphonops
Mimosiphonops reinhardti
Mimosiphonops vermiculatus
Genus Siphonops
Siphonops annulatus
Siphonops hardyi
Siphonops leucoderus
Siphonops paulensis

References

AmphibiaWeb: Information on amphibian biology and conservation. [web application]. 2004. Berkeley, California: AmphibiaWeb. Available: http://amphibiaweb.org/. Retrieved 26 August 2004

 
Amphibian families
Amphibians of Central America
Amphibians of South America